Countess of Stafford is a title given to the wife of the Earl of Stafford. Women who have held the title include:

Margaret de Audley, 2nd Baroness Audley (1318-c.1351; her husband became earl in 1350)
Philippa de Beauchamp (c.1344–1386)
Anne of Gloucester (1383–1438), wife of both the 3rd Earl and, after his death, the 5th Earl
Anne Stafford, Duchess of Buckingham (died 1480), whose husband was created Duke of Buckingham in 1444
Margaret Beaufort, Countess of Stafford (c.1437–1474)
Mary (Stafford) Howard, Countess of Stafford (died 1693), wife of William Howard, 1st Viscount Stafford Countess in her own right; see list of peerages created for women